The major causes of deaths in Finland are cardiovascular diseases, malignant tumors, dementia and Alzheimer's disease, respiratory diseases, alcohol related diseases and accidental poisoning by alcohol. In 2010 the leading causes of death among men aged 15 to 64 were alcohol related deaths, ischaemic heart disease, accident, suicides, lung cancer and cerbrovascular diseases. Among women the leading causes were breast cancer, alcohol related deaths, accidents, suicides, ischaemic heart disease and lung cancer.

Healthcare system 
Finland is well-known for its high-quality health care. Public health services are available to everyone who lives in the country. Finland has both public health services and private health care services.
The Finnish Ministry of Social Affairs and Health supports the welfare of people in Finland via social and health services and by ensuring income security.
Local government and the municipalities have the responsibility to organize good social and health care services for the residents.

Finnish health care is focusing on disease prevention and health promotion. Primary health care includes preventive health care system for different age groups: maternal health care for pregnant women, health care for newborn baby and child until school age. School health care is for school aged children and student health care is for youths and young students. In Finland it is statutory that employers offer health care services to their workers. 
Organized and comprehensive disease prevention and health promotion system is one of the key factors for a well-functioning system and the health outcomes are good.

Finland has high-quality specialized medical care, and it is usually provided at hospitals. The most demanding treatment is provided in hospital districts and there are five catchment areas, which are University Hospitals of Helsinki, Turku, Tampere, Oulu and Kuopio. 
Every health care professional is either a licensed professional or professional with a protected occupational title. This means that the individual health care professional has a license to work due to completing a training programme in the relevant legislation and decrees.

Health status 
A new measure of expected human capital calculated for 195 countries from 1990 to 2016 and defined for each birth cohort as the expected years lived from age 20 to 64 years and adjusted for educational attainment, learning or education quality, and functional health status was published by the Lancet in September 2018. Finland had the highest level of expected human capital: 28·4 health, education, and learning-adjusted expected years lived between age 20 and 64 years.

Alcohol consumption 
The total annual alcohol consumption has risen from 7.6 litres (in 1985) to 10.0 litres of 100% alcohol equivalent per capita in 2010. There has been a small reduction in alcohol consumption in the recent years. Alcohol use is highest in the Northern Finland with 10.9 litres and lowest at the Åland Islands with 5.7 litres per person. Although the consumption is average to other western countries, binge drinking with especially teenagers and becoming intoxicated has remained as a characteristic of Finnish drinking habits. Finland has a national alcohol programme to reduce the long-term effects of alcohol consumption. The World Health Organization has published a list of countries by alcohol consumption.

Smoking rates 

Smoking among adults has shown a marked decline over the past thirty years in most OECD countries. Much of this decline also in Finland can be attributed to policies aimed at reducing tobacco consumption through public awareness campaigns, advertising bans and increased taxation. Smoking in Finland has reduced, and now the smoking rates among adults in Finland in 2009 stood at 18.6%, lower than the OECD average of 22.3%.

Drug usage 
Drug use is not a major public health problem in Finland. The most commonly used drug is cannabis. According to a study from 2008, the percentage of the population aged 15 to 69 who had at some point in their lives tried cannabis was 13%; 3% of the population had used cannabis within the previous 12 months.

Obesity 
Overweight and obesity are common in Finland. Half of the adults are overweight, and every fifth adult is obese. The weight in men has increased since 1970’s, in women since 1980’s. Among the Nordic countries Finland ranks the highest in a percentage of adults who are overweight. In comparison to other European countries, Finland is slightly above the average but overweight is still more common in South Europe and Great Britain. Overweight among children and adolescents has also become widespread. The number of overweight 12- to 18-year-olds has nearly tripled in the past four decades. 10% of boys and 15% of girls in preschool were overweight in a follow-up from 2007 to 2009

Communicable diseases

HIV/AIDS is not a major public health concern in Finland. The prevalence among adult population on 2009 was 0.1%. HIV/AIDS in Europe is much more common than in Finland, and the countries very near to Finland have much higher prevalence rates, due to increased travel HIV/AIDS rates in Finland may rise. It had the lowest rate of death from communicable diseases in Europe (9 per 100,000) in 2015.

Noncommunicable diseases

The most significant public health problems are currently circulatory diseases, cancer, musculoskeletal diseases and mental health problems. Emerging problems are obesity, chronic lung diseases and type 2 diabetes. 300 000 Finns are diagnosed with diabetes. Approximately 200 000 suffer from type 2 diabetes unknowingly and many more have prediabetes. The number of people with diabetes are estimated to double in 10 years. Most of the incidences could be prevented with healthy life styles, i.e. sufficient level of physical activity, obtaining normal weight and eating healthy.

Major causes of deaths in Finland are cardiovascular diseases, malignant tumours, dementia and Alzheimer's disease, respiratory diseases, alcohol related diseases and accidental poisoning by alcohol. In 2010 the leading causes of death among men aged 15 to 64 were alcohol related deaths, ischaemic heart disease, accident, suicides, lung cancer and cerbrovascular diseases. Among women the leading causes were breast cancer, alcohol related deaths, accidents, suicides, ischaemic heart disease and lung cancer.

Mental health

Suicide mortality in Finland has generally been one of the highest in Europe, but it has reduced to 18 per 100 000 population in
2005. One reason for this may be the large national suicide prevention project which was carried out between 1986 and 1996. The World Health Organization has compiled a list of countries by suicide rate. There is a high level of education of mental health workers in Finland and several effective mental health programs have been conducted within at-risk groups

Sustainable Development Goals SDG3

Maternal mortality

One of the Sustainable development goal 3 targets is to reduce the global maternal mortality ratio to less than 70 per 100 000  live births, by 2030.

Finland is one of the countries that achieved the lowest maternal mortality ratio. After 2010 only 3 mothers die annually for every 100,000 births.

Child and infant mortality

The proposed SDG target for aims to end, by 2030, preventable deaths of newborns and children under 5 years of age, with all countries aiming to reduce neonatal mortality to at least as low as 12 deaths per 1,000 live births and under-5 mortality to at least as low as 25 deaths per 1,000 live births. 

In Finland, the mortality of under 5 years of age was 6.6 deaths per 1,000 live births in 1990, and 2.2 in 2019, and under 1 year of age it was 5.6 deaths per 1,000 live births in 1990 and 1.8 in 2019.

Life expectancy at birth was 82 in Finland in 2019. Among males the life expectancy was 79 and among females 85. 

Due to the high life expectancy at birth and low maternal and under-5 child mortality rates it is fair to say that the health care system is effective in Finland.

Vaccination program in Finland 
In Finland there is the national vaccination program, which is very comprehensive. Child health clinics, school health care and local health centers offer vaccinations against 12 different diseases for every child, free of charge.
HPV vaccines were given first for girls, but from 2020 HPV vaccines are also offered for boys.
For adults, the vaccination program recommends giving booster doses of tetanus and diphtheria on a set schedule, and other vaccines are boosted if it is necessary.
Free influenza vaccines are offered every year for the vulnerable groups and other risk groups. 
A well-organized vaccination program and good vaccine coverage of the population has been one of the significant factors reducing severe diseases and communicable diseases in Finland.

See also 
 Healthcare in Finland
 Finnish heritage disease
 Northern epilepsy syndrome

References